Katit Indian Reserve No. 1 is the main Indian reserve of the Wuikinuxv people, and is one of the three reserves governed by the Wuikinuxv Nation band government. It is located in British Columbia, Canada, on the entrance to Owikeno Lake on the north side of the Wannock River near to, but separate from, the non-native community and sport fishing resort of Rivers Inlet.

See also 
 List of Indian reserves in British Columbia

References

Central Coast of British Columbia
Indian reserves in British Columbia
Wuikinuxv